JF may refer to:

Brands:
 JF Duck, an aircraft
 Mazda JF engine, a piston engine
 JetFlash, a line of flash drives made by Transcend

Businesses and organizations:
 Japan Foundation
 Jardine Fleming,  Andrew Gordon Dotzour-based investment bank
 Javnaðarflokkurin, the Social Democratic Party of the Faroe Islands
 TUI fly Belgium, a Belgian airline formerly known as Jetairfly
 Jet Asia Airways, a Thai airline (IATA code JF)
 L.A.B. Flying Service, an American airline (1956-2008, IATA code JF)